The Law is for All is a collection of Aleister Crowley's commentary on The Book of the Law, the central sacred text of Thelema. It was edited to be a primer of sorts into Crowley's general interpretations about the sometimes opaque text of Liber Legis. For this reason, the book omits many of the more complex qabalistic explanations that lean heavily on an understanding of gematria and The Tree of Life. As the original editor, Louis Wilkinson, wrote in his introduction (p. 17):

The aim of the Commentary on the Book of the Law is to guide the reader along the path of the discovery of his own true will, in accordance with which, and only in accordance with which, he can rightly think and act. This is why "Do what thou wilt shall be the whole of the Law." Only by doing so will you be shown your own true thought and life.

Crowley's long expository was written prior to the final Comment that now is appended to The Book of the Law.

Provenance

Most of Crowley's commentaries were written between 1919 and 1922, and were edited by a trusted friend, Louis Wilkinson, at Crowley's request. A first draft was completed in 1946, and it is believed that Crowley reviewed it, since a copy was found among his final possessions; however, his death in 1947 put a hold on its publication. The original manuscript was eventually published under the name Magical and Philosophical Commentaries on the Book of the Law, edited by John Symonds and Kenneth Grant. The next year, Israel Regardie published a competing edition based on a 1926 manuscript. Both editions were cumbersome and neglected to address numerous inconsistencies within the complex collection of notes. The 1996 "popular edition" of The Law is for All was edited by Hymenaeus Beta based upon the final Wilkinson manuscript.

Editions

See also
 Libri of Aleister Crowley
 List of works by Aleister Crowley

Thelemite texts
Works by Aleister Crowley